Paperboy Love Prince, also known as Paperboy Prince of the Suburbs, (born 1992/1993) is an American artist, community activist and political candidate who resides in Brooklyn, New York City.

Early life
Prince grew up in Washington, D.C. One of their grandfathers was a Pentecostal bishop, and both of their parents are devoutly religious. As a child, they worked as a newspaper carrier delivering The Wall Street Journal.

When Prince was 12, their mother won a contest which permitted her to bring them to have lunch with congressional representatives. Following that experience, Prince participated in youth government programs and eventually had internships with the U.S. House of Representatives and the U.S. Supreme Court. In college, Prince studied journalism and computer science while also creating art and hosting entertainment events.

Political activities

Paperboy Love Prince started in politics by hosting concerts which provided voter registration for attendees. While hosting these events Prince was also participating in protests and seeking to contact their elected representatives. Upon seeing how elected officials sometimes win by small margins, they became more intent on encouraging communities to vote as a way of advocating for themselves. Prince claimed that voter turnout for their party in their district has recently been as low as 4%, and that a slightly higher turnout could lead to major changes. 

Poverty reduction is a key goal of Prince's political planning. Prince supports the police abolition movement.

Prince hosts a community center called the Love Gallery on Myrtle Avenue in Bushwick, Brooklyn. In addition to being a place for community meetings, the Love Gallery is also a vintage clothing store, a food distribution center, and their political campaign headquarters.

Campaign for New York's 7th Congressional District
In 2020 Prince was a candidate in the primary for New York's 7th congressional district competing against incumbent Nydia Velázquez. Prince received 20% of the vote to their opponent's 80%.

In Prince's campaign their political platform included advocacy for universal basic income, Medicare for all, and spreading love. 

Some media portrayed Prince's campaign as a longshot. Even while doing so, commentators remarked that if elected Prince would be setting various precedents including being the first nonbinary congressperson.

In preparation for the election, Prince overcame a challenge to their bid to appear on the ballot.

2021 New York City mayoral campaign
In December 2020, Prince registered as a candidate for Mayor of New York City in the 2021 Democratic primary. If elected, Prince would have been the youngest mayor in the history of New York City.

Prince's campaign manager was 13-year old student Theo Demel, who believes that homework is unconstitutional. The campaign's goal was to raise $2 million. Part of the fundraising strategy included busking outside the Myrtle Avenue station in Bushwick, Brooklyn. The campaign's major policy points included fighting poverty and providing more housing for New York City residents. The campaign hosted weekly food distribution events, giving away food donated by churches to whoever happened to show up.

In May 2021, Prince challenged their electoral competitor Andrew Yang in both a basketball game and rap battle at Tompkins Square Park.

One of the criteria for joining the city's mayoral debates was fundraising a minimal amount of money. Prince was among the candidates who met the criteria to appear on the ballot, but did not meet the criteria to join the debates. While Prince was not inside the building to participate in mayoral debates, they were with the crowd outside, rallying attendees from a bus known as the "Love Tank". Prince's performance outside the debate included singing about affordable housing.

A writer for Harvard Political Review said that Prince's campaign could shift discussion about what sorts of political policies are acceptable to discuss and also shift the perception of the electability of non-white candidates. A writer for The Red Hook Star-Revue said that Prince was a candidate to take seriously. That paper also endorsed Prince for mayor. Trevor Noah of The Daily Show showcased Prince's idea that police should reward people for doing good as an alternative to spotting violations. The City surveyed Prince on their political positions and published their responses.

Prince received 0.4% of the vote and was not elected.

2022 campaigns
Following the 2021 election Prince announced intent to seek candidacy in the 2022 elections for 11 congressional districts and the New York governorship. They again got on the ballot for congress in NY district 7.

Music
By 2015 Paperboy the Prince was rapper and a center of attention among the fans at games of the basketball team Washington Wizards. They got recognition for their effort in organizing a music campaign to raise $20 million to bring DC-native basketball player Kevin Durant to the Wizards.

At the 2016 South by Southwest, Prince spoke on behalf of street performers to reporters on the condition that Prince could talk out loud on microphone, and that they got a hug.

Prince received death threats while performing music as Minister of Fun at an anti-Trump art production by LaBeouf, Rönkkö & Turner at the Museum of the Moving Image in the days after President Trump's inauguration.

In 2017 musician Azealia Banks established record label Chaos & Glory Recordings, with Prince as the first artist signed to produce music.

Personal life
Prince is non-binary and prefers the pronouns they/them or the neopronouns God/Goddess.

They dress as "royalty" to draw attention to how politicians can hold power for longer than kings or queens. In an interview with fashion magazine V,  Prince explained how freedom in fashion encourages freedom in thinking and welcoming of diversity. They often wear a Game Boy Advance SP or Game Boy Color around their neck.

Prince's role models include Martin Luther King Jr. and Andrew Yang in the context of racial justice and universal basic income respectively.

Electoral history

References

Further consideration

External links

People from Bushwick, Brooklyn
21st-century American politicians
American performance artists
Non-binary artists
1990s births
Living people
Non-binary musicians
Non-binary activists
Candidates in the 2021 United States elections
Candidates in the 2022 United States House of Representatives elections